Harpesaurus modiglianii, also known commonly as Modigliani's nose-horned lizard, is a species of lizard in the family Agamidae. The species is endemic to Indonesia.

Etymology
The specific name, modiglianii, is honor of Italian botanist Elio Modigliani.

Geographic range
H. modiglianii is indigenous to northern Sumatra, Indonesia.

Habitat
The preferred natural habitat of H. modiglianii is forest.

Description
H. modiglianii has a sickle-shaped upturned nasal appendage.

Reproduction
H. modiglianii is oviparous.

References

Further reading
Putra CA, Amarasinghe AAT, Hikmatullah D, Scali S, Brinkman J, Manthey U, Ineich I (2020). "Rediscovery of Modigliani's nose-horned lizard Harpesaurus modiglianii Vinciguerra, 1933 (Reptilia: Agamidae) after 129 years without any observation". Taprobanica 9 (1): 3–11 + Plates 1–3.
Vinciguerra D (1933). "Descrizione di una nuova specie di Harpesaurus di Sumatra". Annali del Museo Civico di Storia Naturale Giacomo Doria 56: 355–357. (Harpesaurus modiglianii, new species). (in Italian).

Harpesaurus
Reptiles of Indonesia
Reptiles described in 1933
Taxa named by Decio Vinciguerra
Taxobox binomials not recognized by IUCN